Mount Tuve is a mountain (935 m) whose summit rises above the ice surface just south of the base of Wirth Peninsula, Ellsworth Land. It was discovered by the Ronne Antarctic Research Expedition (RARE), 1947–48, under Finn Ronne. He named it for Merle Antony Tuve, Director of the Department of Terrestrial Magnetism of the Carnegie Institution, Washington, DC, who furnished instruments for the expedition.

Mountains of Ellsworth Land